Michael Mmoh was the defending champion but chose not to defend his title.

Lloyd Harris won the title after defeating Stefano Napolitano 6–4, 6–3 in the final.

Seeds

Draw

Finals

Top half

Bottom half

References
Main Draw
Qualifying Draw

Kentucky Bank Tennis Championships - Men's Singles
2018 Men's Singles